The Nekaneet Reserve is an Indian reserve of the Nekaneet Cree Nation in Saskatchewan. It is 121 kilometres southwest of Swift Current. In the 2016 Canadian Census, it recorded a population of 182 living in 46 of its 62 total private dwellings. In the same year, its Community Well-Being index was calculated at 58 of 100, compared to 58.4 for the average First Nations community and 77.5 for the average non-Indigenous community.

References

Indian reserves in Saskatchewan
Nekaneet Cree Nation